Weir v Secretary of State for Transport [2005] EWHC 2192 (Ch) is a UK enterprise law case, concerning railways in the UK.

Facts
Weir and 48,000 other shareholders of Railtrack claimed that Stephen Byers’ decision to force Railtrack into administration amounted to the tort of misfeasance in public office and a breach of the Human Rights Act 1998, on the theory that their property had been deprived. The shareholders raised £4m together to fight the case. They argued their property was expropriated without adequate compensation.

Judgment
Lindsay J rejected the claims.

See also

United Kingdom enterprise law

Notes

References

United Kingdom enterprise case law